Iurie Bolboceanu (born 1959) is a Moldovan politician.

He served as member of the Parliament of Moldova (2005–2009).

He was arrested on March 17, 2017, on charges of espionage and high treason, on behalf of Russia. He was found guilty and sentenced to fourteen years in prison.

References

External links 
 Parlamentul Republicii Moldova
  List of candidates to the position of deputy in the Parliament of the Republic of Moldova for parliamentary elections of 6 March, 2005 of the Electoral Bloc “Moldova Democrata”
 List of deputies elected in the March 6 parliamentary elections
 Lista deputaţilor aleşi la 6 martie 2005 în Parlamentul Republicii Moldova

1959 births
Living people
Moldovan MPs 2005–2009
Electoral Bloc Democratic Moldova MPs
People convicted of spying for the Russian Federation
People convicted of treason